LG Innotek Co., Ltd., an affiliate of LG Group, is an electronic component manufacturer headquartered in Seoul, South Korea. LG Innotek produces core components of mobile devices, automotive displays, semiconductors, and smart products. Most of the company's revenue is generated from selling camera modules for the iPhone.

History
LG Innotek was set up as Goldstar Precision in 1976. LG Innotek spun off its defense business, NEXFuture1, and sold it to LIG Group in 2004. LG Innotek merged LG Micron, another LG Group component-producing arm, in July 2009.

See also
 iPhone hardware

References

External links

 

LG Corporation
South Korean companies established in 1976
Companies listed on the Korea Exchange
Companies based in Seoul